Gay Army is a Danish comedy reality television series. It centers around nine effeminate gay men put into the hands of a drill sergeant who puts them through military training exercises.  The series was first broadcast in Sweden, Norway and Denmark. The series has also been sold to Italy, Germany, Canada, Switzerland and Poland, although protests led to the show being cancelled in Poland before it aired.

Synopsis
In each episode the gay recruits face new training missions featuring stereotypically masculine tasks to prepare them for a mock military operation. Contestants are treated to nights of partying and other rewards if the missions are accomplished.

Reception
LGBT rights activists protested the show's stereotypical premise.  A Swedish organization called the 'Homo-, Bi-, and Transsexuals in the Armed Forces' (informally associated with the Swedish Armed Forces) met with the production director to ask the network not to air it.  Despite this, the show has been very popular with audiences, and has been nominated for awards at the Rose d'Or as well as the 2006 Danish TV Awards.
It also caused a small outcry in the media, which was quickly silenced.

References

External links
 
 

Danish LGBT-related television shows
Danish reality television series
Gay effeminacy
2000s LGBT-related comedy television series
Gay-related television shows
2000s LGBT-related reality television series
Makeover reality television series
Stereotypes of LGBT people
Kanal 5 (Danish TV channel) original programming